Wilhelm Eilers (27 September 1906 in Leipzig – 3 July 1989 in Würzburg) was a  German Iranist .

Life 
Eilers studied music and law as well as linguistics and the cuneiform script in Freiburg im Breisgau, Munich and Leipzig, among others. With Hans Heinrich Schaeder. He made the acquaintance of Walther Hinz. In 1931 he received his doctorate in Leipzig on forms of society in ancient Babylonian law. In the same year he became a member of the DMG. In 1936 he completed his habilitation at Schaeder in Leipzig. From 1936 he was a research assistant at the Archaeological Institute of the German Empire (AIDR) in Berlin.  From 1936 he was a research assistant at the Archaeological Institute of the German Empire (AIDR) in Berlin.In 1937 he traveled to Iran, first in Tehran, then in Isfahan to set up a branch of the AIDR, after Eilers failed to come up with a plan to set up a branch in Baghdad in Iraq due to a lack of financial support from the Führer’s office.

Book

Effects\Works
 Effects\Works Der alte Name des persischen Neujahrsfestes. 1953
 Deutsch-Persisches Wörterbuch. In mehreren Lieferungen von A bis feucht erschienen zwischen 1959 und 1983.
 Als Herausgeber: Persische Handschriften. Teil 1. 1968.
 Die vergleichend-semasiologische Methode in der Orientalistik. 1974.
 Herausgegeben mit Ulrich Schapka: Westiranische Mundarten aus der Sammlung Wilhelm Eilers. Band 1: Die Mundart von Chunsar. 1976; Band 2: Die Mundart von Gäz. 1979; Band 3: Die Mundart von Sivänd. 1988.
 Sinn und Herkunft der Planetennamen. 1978.
 Geographische Namengebung in und um Iran. Ein Überblick in Beispielen. 1982.
 Der Name Demawend. 1988.

References 

Writers from Leipzig
Iranologists
1989 deaths
1906 births
Nazi Party members
Officers Crosses of the Order of Merit of the Federal Republic of Germany